Seyfi Berksoy (1903 – 12 November 1974) was a Turkish wrestler. He competed in the Greco-Roman light heavyweight event at the 1924 Summer Olympics.

References

External links
 

1903 births
1974 deaths
Olympic wrestlers of Turkey
Wrestlers at the 1924 Summer Olympics
Turkish male sport wrestlers
Place of birth missing